The ASK 21 is a glass-reinforced plastic (GRP) two-seat glider aircraft with a T-tail. The ASK 21 is designed primarily for beginner instruction, but is also suitable for cross-country flying and aerobatic instruction.

Design and development
The ASK 21 was designed by Rudolf Kaiser to replace the popular ASK 13, providing a modern two-seat aircraft bridging the gap between initial training and single-seat performance flying. The ASK 21 is the first full-GRP two-seater produced by Schleicher, flying for the first time in February 1979 (6.2.1979). Production also began in 1979, remaining in production to this day (May 2018), over 900 units completed. In December 2004 the ASK 21 Mi, a self-launching version, made its first flight. In 2003 the operating time was extended to 18,000 hours A revised and improved version, the ASK 21B was introduced in 2018.

Construction
The two seats are in a tandem arrangement with dual controls, adjustable rudder pedals and seatbacks. The fuselage consists of a tubular sandwich and thus offers passive safety with low weight. The two-piece, mid-set, cantilever wing is a single-spar glass-fiber construction without flaps, but with upper side Schempp-Hirth-type air brakes. The wingtips curve downward, providing tip skids that allow take-offs without a wing helper (small wheel added with ASK-21 mi). The T-tail possesses a fixed horizontal stabilizer and an elevator with spring trim and automatic connections. The undercarriage consists of two or three fixed wheels. The main wheel lies behind the centre of gravity and has a hydraulically operated disc brake. Checking the tire pressure is hindered by the need for removing the wheel fairing. The tail unit has a rubber skid or a tailwheel.

Flight characteristics
The thick wing profile gives good low-speed characteristics (nominal stall speed approximately 65 km/h or 35 knots). The flight characteristics are docile; its stall is gentle, with ample vibration warning, and is easily recoverable. The nose does not noticeably drop, but the variometer indicates a high rate of descent and the vibration continues until back pressure is released and stall recovery is initiated.

The glider has little tendency to enter a spin. In order to make spinning possible for training purposes or demonstrations a spin kit is available from the manufacturer. It consists of ballast discs applied to the tail to change the center of gravity according to the weight of the crew. With this device the ASK 21 when slowed to stall speed with rudder input drops one wing and begins to rotate. Recovery is standard, utilizing neutralized ailerons, full opposite rudder until the rotation stops and then centralizing the rudder, relaxing back pressure to break the stall, and then easing the stick back to pull out of the dive.

When entering a side slip, which is not uncommon as an energy management technique, the rudder can aerodynamically over centre, requiring an input from the pilot for the rudder pedals to return to neutral.

Variants
ASK 21
Production sailplane
ASK 21 Mi
Self-launching sailplane, as ASK 21 with a retractable IAE R50-AA rotary engine with a fixed pitch propeller mounted behind the wing.
Vanguard TX.1
The ASK-21 acquired by the UK Ministry of Defence for use by the Air Cadet organisations.
ASK 21B
Improved version of the original ASK 21. New features: automatic control connections, internal spin ballast, revised canopy, more effective ailerons.

Specifications (ASK 21)

Operators

Military

Current

Royal Australian Air Force
Australian Air Force Cadets - 11 

Portuguese Air Force
Portuguese Air Force Academy

Former

Royal Air Force for Air Training Corps (Vanguard TX.1)

Civilian

Association de Vol à Voile Champlain - 2 
Cu Nim Gliding Club 
Great lakes Gliding Club 
Rideau Valley Soaring School 
Southern Ontario Soaring Association - 3 
York Soaring 
Youth Flight Canada 

Yorkshire Gliding Club - 2 
Devon and Somerset Gliding Club
London Gliding Club - 7 
Buckminster Gliding Club
Midland Gliding Club
Cranwell Gliding Club

Mid Atlantic Soaring Association - 2

See also
IS 28 B2
Schleicher ASK 23
ZS Jezow PW-6U
Grob G103a Twin II
PZL Bielsko SZD-50

References

Further reading

External links

Alexander Schleicher GmbH & Co English version 
Johnson R, A Flight Test Evaluation of the ASK 21, Soaring, July 1985
European Aviation Safety Agency Type Certificate Data Sheet

1970s German sailplanes
Schleicher aircraft
Mid-wing aircraft
Aircraft first flown in 1979
T-tail aircraft